Raymong Wong Hung-chiu (born 29 July 1957), is the previous Permanent Secretary for the Civil Service Bureau of Hong Kong.

Background
Wong was joined the Government in the Administrative Service in August 1980, served in various bureaux and departments, including the Security Branch Commissioner for Narcotics from January to December 1996.  In January 1997 to July as the Chief Secretary's Office Deputy Director of the Handover Ceremony Co-ordination Office, and in August 1997 to July 2001 as Deputy Secretary for Security. From July 2001 to August 2003 as Commissioner of Customs and Excise, and in July 2002 promoted to Administrative Officer Staff Grade. From August 2003 to October 2006 appointed as Commissioner, Independent Commission Against Corruption.  After Fanny Law resigned as Permanent Secretary for Education of Hong Kong, he was appointed as her replacement on the same day. From 2010, Wong was appointed as Permanent Secretary for the Civil Service.

References

1957 births
Living people
Government officials of Hong Kong